The Faces of the Moon (Original title: Las caras de la luna) is a 2002 Mexican drama film directed by Guita Schyfter. The film centres upon a group of female jurors at the 3rd Latin American Women's Film Festival in Mexico City. The film reunites Geraldine Chaplin and Ana Torrent who previously starred as mother and daughter in the Carlos Saura films; Cría cuervos (1976) and Elisa, vida mía (1977).

Plot
The female jury, representing the United States, Spain, Uruguay, Costa Rica, Mexico and Argentina interact over their shared experiences. Shosh (Reyna) is an Argentine director that was a political exile in Mexico. Joan (Chaplin) is an American theorist and lesbian activist. Mariana (Montejo) is a pioneer of filmmaking, Julia (Lev) is a former terrorist from Uruguay who was imprisoned for thirteen years. The group complete their duties under the direction of the organizer, Magdalena (Bracho).

Cast
Carola Reyna as Shosh Balsher
Geraldine Chaplin as Joan Turner
Ana Torrent as Maruja Céspedes 
Carmen Montejo as Mariana Toscano 
Diana Bracho as Magdalena Hoyos 
Haydee de Lev as Julia

References

External links
 

2002 films
Mexican drama films
2000s Spanish-language films
2000s Mexican films